The University of South Florida Athletic Hall of Fame was established in 2009 to recognize and perpetuate the memory of student athletes, teams, coaches and administrators who have made demonstrably outstanding and significant contributions to the success, tradition and heritage of USF Athletics, and who demonstrate the character and values that define the highest principles of sport. Induction in the University of South Florida Athletic Hall of Fame is the highest honor afforded by the USF Athletics Department.

The Hall of Fame is located within the Lee Roy Selmon Athletic Center on USF's Tampa campus.

History 

The Hall of Fame was established by Director of Athletics Doug Woolard in 2009 with the first 16 inductees. 12 of the inaugural inductees were members or coaches of the 1985 USF women's swimming team, which won the first and only NCAA national championship in USF history. Mark Harlan took over as athletic director in 2014, and no new members were inducted during his tenure. Michael Kelly brought the Hall of Fame back in 2019 after he became USF's new AD, though no class was inducted in 2021 due to the induction ceremony for 2020 being delayed by the COVID-19 pandemic.

Selection process

Nominations 
Nominations are accepted from both the Hall of Fame voting committee and the general public. Individuals must be at least four years removed from their USF career to be nominated. Nominees are eligible for induction for up to three years after being nominated. If not selected in that period of time, they must be re-nominated for further consideration.

Induction 
Every year the three nominees with the most votes from the Hall of Fame committee, provided that they receive votes from at least five of the nine members of the committee, will be inducted into the USF Athletic Hall of Fame. Prior to 2019, any nominee that received six or more votes from the nine member committee was inducted, regardless of how many nominees passed that threshold. The annual induction ceremony takes place at USF's Homecoming football game.

Voting committee 
The USF Hall of Fame voting committee consists of nine members: a past Hall of Fame inductee, two USF Varsity Club Board members, the Faculty Athletics Representative, a Senior Woman Administrator, a USF Alumni Association representative, a former USF Athletics coach or staff member, a distinguished community member and the Director of Athletics. All members of the committee serve a term of two years with the exception of the athletic director who serves on the committee for their entire tenure as AD and appoints the other members of the committee.

Inductees 
As of 2022, the Hall features 43 members: 35 players, 6 coaches, and 3 athletic directors with one member inducted as both a player and a coach.

Athletic Directors

Coaches

Athletes

Number of inductees by sport

See also 
University of South Florida

South Florida Bulls

List of University of South Florida alumni

References

External links
 

College sports halls of fame in the United States
South Florida Bulls
Halls of fame in Florida